Andrés Parra Medina (born 18 September 1977) is a Colombian film and television actor. He is best known for portraying the drug lord Pablo Escobar in the Canal Caracol TV series Pablo Escobar, el patrón del mal.

Filmography

Film

Television

References

1977 births
Living people
Male actors from Cali
Colombian male film actors
Colombian male telenovela actors
Colombian male television actors